Bangaru Pichika is a 1968 Telugu-language comedy-drama film directed by Bapu, produced by Kommana Narayana Rao and written by Mullapudi Venkata Ramana. It stars Chandra Mohan and Vijaya Nirmala. The music was composed by K. V. Mahadevan. Bapu remade the film as Pelli Koduku in 1994 with Naresh and Divyavani.

Plot
Chandra Mohan is the son of a rich mother (Shanta Kumari) and fun-loving father. His mother asks him to marry, but his father advises him to run away from home and enjoy life. His mother announces rewards for those who find him. He tries to escape all these people. A criminal gang which has an eye on his properties sends one of their female members (Vijaya Nirmala) to attract him. But she falls in love with him. The remaining story is about how they both escape the criminal gang and unite.

Cast
 Chandra Mohan
 Vijaya Nirmala
 Shantha Kumari
 Raja Babu
 Vinnakota Ramanna Pantulu
 Sakshi Ranga Rao
 Sivarama Krishnaiah (Guest)
 Jagga Rao (Guest)

Soundtrack
All the songs were written by Arudra.

"Emi Chesukunedi"
"Manase Gani"
"Oho Bangaaru"
"Oho Nidura"

References

External links

1968 films
1960s Telugu-language films
Indian comedy-drama films
Films directed by Bapu
Films scored by K. V. Mahadevan
Indian black-and-white films
1968 comedy-drama films